= 1957 Ålandic legislative election =

Legislative elections were held in Åland on 15 June 1957.

== Results ==
Party	Votes	%	Seats	+/–
Åländsk samling - Borgerliga eller opolitiska	4,374	75.52	24	New
Åländsk samling - Vänstergruppen	1,053	18.18	4	New
Folkdemokraterna	365	6.30	2	0
Total	5,792	100.00	30	0
